Llanfihangel Bachellaeth is a former civil parish in the Welsh county of Gwynedd.  It was abolished in 1934, and incorporated into Buan.

References

Buan, Gwynedd